"Ode to Joy" is a poem by Friedrich Schiller.

Ode to Joy may also refer to:
The "Ode to Joy" theme from Ludwig van Beethoven's 9th Symphony, the best known setting of the poem
Ode to Joy, the name of the Anthem of Europe, based on Beethoven's work
Ode to Joy (The Deadly Snakes album), by the Canadian indie rock band The Deadly Snakes
Ode to Joy (Wilco album), a 2019 album by the American alternative rock band Wilco
"Ode to Joy", episode title of the series finale of Beverly Hills, 90210
Ode to Joy (TV series), a 2016 Chinese TV series
Ode to Joy (film), a 2019 American romantic comedy

See also
To Joy (film), 1950 film by Ingmar Bergman
"The Hymn of Joy", a popular Christian hymn sung to Beethoven's melody